Ferdinand Kronawetter (26 February 1838 – 20 January 1913) was an Austrian left-liberal politician.

Life
Kronawetter was born in Vienna, the son of a master locksmith. He studied law at the University of Vienna and became a magistrate. In 1873, he founded a democratic association in Josefstadt and was elected to the Reichsrat. While initially affiliated with the Christian Social Party, he came into conflict with the party due to his support for the revolutions of 1848 as well as his opposition to Karl Lueger's Christian antisemitism. Kronawetter resigned his mandate in 1882, was re-elected in 1885, and appeared alongside Engelbert Pernerstorfer as a representative of the workers' movement on the Imperial Council.

Kronawetter was closely affiliated with the Social Democratic Party of Austria, although he never officially joined the party. By 1879, he advocated for universal suffrage, campaigned against corruption, supported self-determination for stateless nations, and supported separation of church and state as a radical anti-clerical.

According to British historian Richard Evans, Ferdinand Kronawetter is the likely originator of the phrase "Antisemitism is the socialism of fools", despite the phrase being commonly attributed to the German social democrat August Bebel and sometimes to Karl Marx.

References

1838 births
1913 deaths
Politicians from Vienna
Constitutional Party (Austria) politicians
Members of the Austrian House of Deputies (1873–1879)
Members of the Austrian House of Deputies (1879–1885)
Members of the Austrian House of Deputies (1885–1891)
Members of the Austrian House of Deputies (1891–1897)
Members of the Austrian House of Deputies (1897–1900)
Austrian socialists
Opposition to antisemitism in Austria
University of Vienna alumni